Alex R. Hernandez Jr. is an Austin, Texas, Santa Fe, New Mexico and New York City based lawyer, who is notable for cases related to nationwide plaintiff personal injury, white collar criminal defendants, national commercial and residential real estate law, probate and estate, immigration and US business legal representation..

Early life
Alex R. Hernandez Jr. was born in the small Texas town of Port Lavaca, Texas in 1971. His grandfather Jesus Hernandez was a janitor at the nearby Alcoa plant and worked part-time as an appliance repairman. His father Alex Hernandez Sr. was in college when Hernandez Jr. was growing up eventually going on to law school. Hernandez Jr. lived in Chicago and Houston as a child. Hernandez Sr. eventually became an attorney in 1978 when Hernandez Jr. was about 8. Hernandez Sr. then started his career as an attorney and worked for Zapata and Aramco as an oil and gas contracts attorney. While working for Aramco, Hernandez Sr. moved his family to Saudi Arabia.

When Hernandez Jr. was ready to enter high school Hernandez Sr. decided it was time to move back to Port Lavaca. Hernandez Jr. went to high school in Port Lavaca Texas and excelled at all activities, he became Band leader and President, an All-State performer, Student Council Representative, and won the French and Jazz Band awards. Hernandez Sr. became the First Hispanic County Judge for Calhoun County, Texas Texas and the First Hispanic County Court at Law Judge for Calhoun County Texas.

Career
Alex R. Hernandez Jr. graduated from Calhoun High School in 1989 and went on to receive degrees from Victoria College in 1991 and the University of Texas at Austin in 1994 where he graduated as Economics Student of the Year with a Bachelor of Arts in Economics. Hernandez worked before deciding to go to school where he applied to one law school St. Mary's University School of Law in the city he was living in at the time, San Antonio, Texas.  Hernandez graduated from St. Mary's in 2001.

During his youth Hernandez worked construction and property jobs which led him to understand that he really needed to get an education. He was also an accomplished musician often playing in Austin venues. He embarked on his educational goals and fulfilled them.

Before going into law school, Hernandez embarked on a career as a financial planner with MONY. Not knowing Spanish was a hindrance on Hernandez so he decided to move to his father's birthplace, Monterrey, Mexico. Hernandez picked up his Spanish quickly and moved to San Antonio where he worked in the mutual fund industry with US Global Investors. Hernandez entered law school in 1998 through 2001. During law school, he worked for Harry Jewett Associates learning property development, street planning, surveying and wastewater planning. He could often be seen in the San Antonio City planning department submitting plats.

During law school Hernandez worked for the legal division of HB Zachry, a San Antonio Texas construction company, and San Antonio personal injury attorney Frank Herrera. Three days after taking the Texas bar, Hernandez began his legal career with Wayne Wright Injury Attorneys in San Antonio trying his first case a month after passing the bar. Within a few years, Hernandez decided to the insurance defense side and moved to Corpus Christi to work for Chaves, Gonzales, and Hoblit. Hernandez embarked on his own in 2005 and has owned his own firm since then, ARH Consulting LLC handling personal injury, real estate, business and commercial law, and other areas of law in Texas, California, and New York.

Hernandez has been a volunteer for several organizations and member of several Victoria, Texas boards including the Victoria Business and Education Coalition, Keep Victoria Beautiful and the Food Bank of the Golden Crescent.

Hernandez is a longtime member of the State Bar of Texas and was part of the Grievance Committee which monitors and disciplines Texas lawyers as well as a member of the, invite-only organization, Texas Trial Lawyers Association and Million Dollar Advocates Forum. Hernandez has received awards and accolades for his work as a lawyer.

Hernandez is the chief executive officer of ARH Consulting LLC, handling Law, Economics, Real Estate and Business matters. Often considered ahead of his time Hernandez built the company from the ground up using educational tools to run the business for his clients including his law firm. The company is based in Austin, Texas.

During the pandemic and after receiving the first vaccines, Hernandez embarked on obtaining multiple licenses in several states and travelled to handle matters in Texas, New York and California.

Hernandez is licensed to practice law in Texas and New York and appears on California civil litigation and Federal cases on occasion. The law firm is headquartered in Corpus Christi and Austin, Texas. Hernandez is a licensed California real estate agent handling probate and estate properties.

Alex R. Hernandez Jr. is the son of long time Texas lawyer and Judge Alex R. Hernandez Sr. Northwestern University School of Law, his mother Andrea Hernandez has been a paralegal for over 40 years, his sister Rachel Hernandez practices family law in Austin Texas. Alex's younger brother Evan currently lives in Tokyo Japan. Alex Hernandez is father to a seventeen year old daughter.

Politics
In 2012, Alex R. Hernandez Jr. ran unsuccessfully for office as a Texas House of Representatives candidate as a Democrat.

References

1971 births
Living people
Texas lawyers
People from Port Lavaca, Texas
Victoria College (Texas) alumni
University of Texas at Austin College of Liberal Arts alumni
St. Mary's University School of Law alumni